Komsomol'skaya Hill is a hill rising to , standing immediately south of Mabus Point on the coast of Antarctica. It was discovered and roughly sketched by the Australasian Antarctic Expedition under Mawson, 1911–14 and later photographed from the air by U.S. Navy Operation Highjump, 1946–47. The formation was rephotographed by the Soviet expedition of 1956, who named it Gora Komsomol'skaya (Young Communist Hill).

References

Hills of Queen Mary Land